Jade Dragon Snow Mountain (Naxi:  or ) is a mountain massif or small mountain range in Yulong Naxi Autonomous County, Lijiang, in Yunnan province, China.

Etymology
The Chinese name,  Yùlóng Xuěshān, translates directly as Jade Dragon Snow Mountain; it is sometimes translated as Mount Yulong or Yulong Snow Mountain.  The mountain's Naxi name is Mount Satseto.

Geography
The Jade Dragon Snow Mountain massif forms the bulk of the larger Yulong Mountains, that stretch further north. The northwestern flank of the massif forms one side of the Tiger Leaping Gorge (Hǔtiào Xiá, 虎跳峡), which has a popular trekking route on the other side.  In this gorge, the Jinsha (upper Yangtze) River descends dramatically between Jade Dragon and Haba Snow Mountain.  The Yulong Mountains lie to the south of the Yun Range and are part of Southwest China's greater Hengduan Mountains.

Settlements surrounding Jade Dragon Snow Mountain include Baisha Town to the south, Longpan Township to the west, Daju Township to the northeast, and Jade Water Village at the foot of the mountain to the east.

Exploration history
In 1938, an expedition led by the Australian lawyer, feminist, conservationist, and mountaineer, Marie Byles, failed to reach the summit due to bad weather. Bitterly disappointed by this failure, she became a follower of Buddhist thought as a consequence.

Shanzidou has been climbed only once, on May 8, 1987, by an American expedition. The summit team comprised Phil Peralta-Ramos and Eric Perlman. They climbed snow gullies and limestone headwalls, and encountered high avalanche danger and sparse opportunities for protection. They rated the maximum technical difficulty of the rock at YDS 5.7.

The Austro-American botanist and explorer Joseph Rock spent many years living in the vicinity of Mt Satseto, and wrote about the region and the Naxi people who occupy it. An interest in Rock later drew the travel writer Bruce Chatwin to the mountain, which he wrote about in an article that appeared in the New York Times and later, retitled, in his essay collection What Am I Doing Here?. Chatwin's article inspired many subsequent travellers, including Michael Palin, to visit the region.

Tourism

The view of the massif from the gardens at the Black Dragon Pool (Heilong Tan) in Lijiang is noted as one of China's finest views. The mountain is part of Yulong Snow Mountain National Scenic Area and National Geological Park, an AAAAA-classified scenic area. Due to the extremely high elevation many people become oxygen starved and carry cans of compressed oxygen to help. Some have criticized the cable for accelerating the melting of the snow and reducing the water retention by the mountain.

The mountain was featured on Episode 4 of The Amazing Race 18.

References

Five-thousanders of the Transhimalayas
National parks of China
Mountains of Yunnan
Tourist attractions in Yunnan
Geography of Lijiang
Yulong Naxi Autonomous County